Spy Hunt, also known as Panther's Moon, is a 1950 American espionage film, based on the novel Panther's Moon by Victor Canning, directed by George Sherman, and starring Howard Duff and Märta Torén.  It was produced by Universal-International Pictures.

Plot
Rival agents in Switzerland seek two escaped panthers, one with microfilm hidden in its collar.

Cast
 Howard Duff as Steve Quain 
 Märta Torén as Catherine Uilven
 Philip Friend as Chris Denson
 Robert Douglas as Paradou
 Philip Dorn as Paul Kopel
 Walter Slezak as Doctor Stahl
 Kurt Kreuger as Captain Heimer
 Aram Katcher as Georg

See also
 List of American films of 1950

External links
 
 
 

1950 films
Film noir
American crime drama films
American spy thriller films
1950 drama films
American black-and-white films
Films about hunters
Films about cats
Films set in Switzerland
Films set in the Alps
Films based on British novels
1950s English-language films
Films directed by George Sherman
1950s American films